Henrietta Swan Leavitt (July 4, 1868 – December 12, 1921) was an American astronomer. A graduate of Radcliffe College, she worked at the Harvard College Observatory as a human computer, tasked with measuring photographic plates to catalog the positions and brightness of stars. This work led her to discover the relation between the luminosity and the period of Cepheid variables. Leavitt's discovery provided astronomers with the first standard candle with which to measure the distance to other galaxies.

Before Leavitt discovered the period-luminosity relationship for Cepheid variables, the only techniques available to astronomers for measuring the distance to a star were based on parallax and triangulation.  Such techniques can only be used for measuring distances up to several hundred light years.  Leavitt's work allowed astronomers to measure distances up to about 20 million light years.  As a result of this, it is now known that our own galaxy, the Milky Way, has a diameter of about 100,000 light years.  After Leavitt's death, Edwin Hubble used Leavitt's period-luminosity relation, together with the galactic spectral shifts first measured by Vesto Slipher at Lowell Observatory, to establish that the universe is expanding (see Hubble's law).

Biography

Early life and education
Henrietta Swan Leavitt was born in Lancaster, Massachusetts, the daughter of Congregational church minister George Roswell Leavitt and his wife Henrietta Swan Kendrick. She was a descendant of Deacon John Leavitt, an English Puritan tailor, who settled in the Massachusetts Bay Colony in the early 17th century. (In the early Massachusetts records the family name was spelled "Levett".) Henrietta Leavitt remained deeply religious and committed to her church throughout her life.

Leavitt attended Oberlin College before transferring to Harvard University's Society for the Collegiate Instruction of Women (later Radcliffe College), receiving a bachelor's degree in 1892. At Oberlin and Harvard, Leavitt studied a broad curriculum that included Latin and classical Greek, fine arts, philosophy, analytic geometry, and calculus. It wasn't until her fourth year of college that Leavitt took a course in astronomy, in which she earned an A−. Leavitt also began working as one of the women "computers" at the Harvard College Observatory, hired by its director Edward Charles Pickering to measure and catalog the brightness of stars as they appeared in the observatory's photographic plate collection. (In the early 1900s, women were not allowed to operate telescopes, but the scientific data were on the photographic plates.)

In 1893, Leavitt obtained credits toward a graduate degree in astronomy for her work at the Harvard College Observatory, but she never completed that degree. In 1898 she became a member of the Harvard staff. She left the observatory to make two trips to Europe and completed a stint as an art assistant at Beloit College in Wisconsin. At this time, she contracted an illness that led to progressive hearing loss.

Astronomical career

Leavitt returned to the Harvard College Observatory from her travels in 1903. Because Leavitt had independent means, Pickering initially did not have to pay her. She was reportedly "hard-working, serious-minded …, little given to frivolous pursuits and selflessly devoted to her family, her church, and her career". One of the women that Leavitt worked with at the Harvard Observatory was Annie Jump Cannon, who shared the experience of being deaf.

Pickering assigned Leavitt to the study of variable stars of the Small and Large Magellanic Clouds, as recorded on photographic plates taken with the Bruce Astrograph of the Boyden Station of the Harvard Observatory in Arequipa, Peru. She identified 1,777 variable stars. In 1908 she published her results in the Annals of the Astronomical Observatory of Harvard College, noting that the brighter variables had the longer period.

In another paper published in 1912, Leavitt looked carefully at the relationship between the periods and the brightness of a sample of 25 of the Cepheids variables in the Small Magellanic Cloud.  This paper was communicated and signed by Edward Pickering, but the first sentence indicates that it was "prepared by Miss Leavitt". Leavitt made a graph of magnitude versus logarithm of period and determined that, in her own words,

She then used the simplifying assumption that all of the Cepheids within the Small Magellanic Cloud were at approximately the same distance, so that their intrinsic brightness could be deduced from their apparent brightness as registered in the photographic plates, up to a scale factor since the distance to the Magellanic Clouds were as yet unknown. She expressed the hope that parallaxes to some Cepheids would be measured, which soon happened, thereby allowing her period-luminosity scale to be calibrated.  This reasoning allowed Leavitt to establish that the logarithm of the period is linearly related to the logarithm of the star's average intrinsic optical luminosity (which is the amount of power radiated by the star in the visible spectrum).

Leavitt also developed, and continued to refine, the Harvard Standard for photographic measurements, a logarithmic scale that orders stars by brightness over 17 magnitudes. She initially analyzed 299 plates from 13 telescopes to construct her scale, which was accepted by the International Committee of Photographic Magnitudes in 1913.

In 1913, Leavitt discovered T Pyxidis, a recurrent nova in Pyxis, and one of the most frequent recurrent novae in the sky with eruptions observed in 1890, 1902, 1920, 1944, 1967, and 2011.

Leavitt was a member of Phi Beta Kappa, the American Association of University Women, the American Astronomical and Astrophysical Society, the American Association for the Advancement of Science, and an honorary member of the American Association of Variable Star Observers. In 1921, when Harlow Shapley took over as director of the observatory, Leavitt was made head of stellar photometry. By the end of that year she had succumbed to cancer and was buried in the Leavitt family plot at Cambridge Cemetery in Cambridge, Massachusetts.

Scientific impact

According to science writer Jeremy Bernstein, "variable stars had been of interest for years, but when she was studying those plates, I doubt Pickering thought she would make a significant discovery—one that would eventually change astronomy."  The period–luminosity relationship for Cepheids, now known as "Leavitt's law", made the stars the first "standard candle" in astronomy, allowing scientists to compute the distances to stars too remote for stellar parallax observations to be useful. One year after Leavitt reported her results, Ejnar Hertzsprung determined the distance of several Cepheids in the Milky Way; with this calibration, the distance to any Cepheid could be accurately determined.

Cepheids were soon detected in other galaxies, such as Andromeda (notably by Edwin Hubble in 1923–24), and they became an important part of the evidence that "spiral nebulae" are independent galaxies located far outside of the Milky Way. Thus, Leavitt's discovery would forever change humanity's picture of the universe, as it prompted Harlow Shapley to move the Sun from the center of the galaxy in the "Great Debate" and Edwin Hubble to move the Milky Way galaxy from the center of the universe.

Leavitt's discovery of a way to accurately measure distances on an inter-galactic scale, paved the way for modern astronomy's understanding of the structure and scale of the universe. The accomplishments of Edwin Hubble, the American astronomer who established that the universe is expanding, also were made possible by Leavitt's groundbreaking research. Hubble often said that Leavitt deserved the Nobel Prize for her work. Mathematician Gösta Mittag-Leffler, a member of the Swedish Academy of Sciences, tried to nominate her for that prize in 1925, only to learn that she had died of cancer three years earlier. (The Nobel Prize is not awarded posthumously.)

Cepheid variables allow astronomers to measure distances up to about 60 million light years.  Even greater distances can now be measured by using the theoretical maximum mass of white dwarfs calculated by Subrahmanyan Chandrasekhar.

Illness and death

Leavitt's scientific work at Harvard was frequently interrupted by illness and family obligations. Her early death at the age of 53 from stomach cancer was seen as a tragedy by her colleagues for reasons that went beyond her scientific achievements. Her colleague Solon I. Bailey wrote in her obituary that "she had the happy, joyful, faculty of appreciating all that was worthy and lovable in others, and was possessed of a nature so full of sunshine that, to her, all of life became beautiful and full of meaning."

"Sitting at the top of a gentle hill," writes George Johnson in his biography of Leavitt, "the spot is marked by a tall hexagonal monument, on top of which sits a globe cradled on a draped marble pedestal. Her uncle Erasmus Darwin Leavitt and his family also are buried there, along with other Leavitts." A plaque memorializing Henrietta and her two siblings, Mira and Roswell, is mounted on one side of the monument. Nearby are the graves of Henry and William James.

Posthumous honors
 The asteroid 5383 Leavitt and the crater Leavitt on the Moon are named after her to honor deaf men and women who have worked as astronomers.
 One of the ASAS-SN telescopes, located in the McDonald Observatory in Texas, is named in her honor.

Books, plays and other media
George Johnson wrote a 2005 biography, Miss Leavitt's Stars, which showcases the triumphs of women's progress in science through the story of Leavitt.

Robert Burleigh wrote the 2013 biography Look Up!: Henrietta Leavitt, Pioneering Woman Astronomer for a younger audience. It is written for four- to eight-year-olds.

Lauren Gunderson wrote a 2015 play, Silent Sky, which followed Leavitt's journey from her acceptance at Harvard to her death.

Theo Strassell wrote a play, "The Troubling Things We Do," an absurdist piece that details the life of Henrietta Leavitt, among other scientists from her era.

Dava Sobel's book The Glass Universe chronicles the work of the women analyzing images taken of the stars at the Harvard College Observatory.

The BBC included Leavitt in their Missed Genius series designed to celebrate individuals from diverse backgrounds who have had a profound effect on our world. 

Central Square Theater commissioned a play, The Women Who Mapped The Stars, by Joyce Van Dyke, as part of the Brit D’Arbeloff Women in Science Production Series, staged by the Nora Theatre Company. The play features Leavitt's story, among others.

See also 
 List of female scientists
 List of deaf people
 Women in science
 Timeline of women in science
 Human computer
 Cepheids

References

Further reading

Sources

External links

 Women in Astronomy Bibliography from the Astronomical Society of the Pacific
 Periods of 25 Variable Stars in the Small Magellanic Cloud. Edward C. Pickering, March 3, 1912; credits Leavitt.
 Henrietta Swan Leavitt: a Star of the Brightest Magnitude ACS/Women Chemists Committee's biography with several links
 Henrietta Swan Leavitt, Tim Hunter (astronomer), The Grasslands Observatory
 Henrietta Swan Leavitt's genealogy
 Henrietta Swan Leavitt – Lady of Luminosity from the Woman Astronomer website
 

1868 births
1921 deaths
Astrometry
American women astronomers
Cepheid variables
History of women in the United States
Harvard Computers
Harvard University staff
Radcliffe College alumni
People from Lancaster, Massachusetts
Leavitt family
American Congregationalists
Deaths from cancer in Massachusetts
19th-century American astronomers
20th-century American astronomers
19th-century American women scientists
20th-century American women scientists
American deaf people
Oberlin College alumni
Scientists with disabilities